"Baby Hope" is a term used with unidentified decedent cases, often when the subject would be a young female. It may refer to:

Anjelica Castillo, who was given the nickname after her discovery in 1991. She was identified in 2013
St. Louis Jane Doe, found in Missouri in 1983
Pueblo County Jane Doe, found in Colorado in 1996